Pendra is a nagar panchayat in the Gaurella-Pendra-Marwahi district in the Indian state of Chhattisgarh.

Geography

Demographics
 India census, Pendra had a population of 12,392. Males constitute 50% of the population and females 50%. Pendra road has an average literacy rate of 70%, higher than the national average of 59.5%: male literacy is 78%, and female literacy is 63%. In Pendra, 13% of the population is under 6 years of age.

See also 
 Gaurella-Pendra-Marwahi district

References

Cities and towns in Gaurella-Pendra-Marwahi district